American Career College is a private, for-profit vocational college offering associate degrees, diplomas, and certificates in healthcare programs. It has campuses in Los Angeles, Ontario, and Anaheim, California, all accredited by the Accrediting Bureau of Health Education Schools. It is a member of the California Association of Private Postsecondary Schools.

History
American Career College was founded by David Pyle in 1978 as the American College of Optics, which specialized in optical dispensing. The name was changed to the American College of Optechs in 1990 before becoming the American Career College in 1993. The college's enrollment increased following the approval of its nursing program in 1994 and the vocational nursing program in 2001. The Ontario campus opened in 2008. ACC's sister school West Coast University holds some classes for ACC on its campus and credits can be transferred between the two institutions. 

In 2020, 79% of enrolled students were female and 58% identified as Hispanic/Latinx.

Programs
American Career College has 12 healthcare programs:
 Medical Assisting (diploma) - Los Angeles, Ontario, Anaheim
 Dental Assisting (diploma) - Los Angeles, Ontario, Anaheim; approved by the Dental Board of California
 Medical Billing and Coding (diploma) - Los Angeles, Ontario, Anaheim
 Pharmacy Technology (diploma) - Los Angeles, Ontario, Anaheim; accredited by the American Society of Health-System Pharmacists
 Optical Technology (diploma) - Los Angeles, Ontario
 Vocational Nursing (diploma) - Los Angeles, Ontario, Anaheim; approved by the California Board Of Vocational Nursing And Psychiatric Technicians
 Surgical Technology (associate) - Los Angeles, Ontario, Anaheim; part of the Surgical Technology (STAB) - Schools and Programs and accredited by the Commission on Accreditation of Allied Health Education Programs
 Respiratory Therapy (associate)- Ontario, Anaheim; accredited by the Commission on Accreditation for Respiratory Care and recognized by the National Board for Respiratory Care for eligibility towards the credentialing examination 
 Occupational Therapy Assistant (associate) - Los Angeles, Ontario, Anaheim; accredited by the American Occupational Therapy Association
 Radiography (associate) - Los Angeles, Ontario, Anaheim
 Nursing (associate) - Los Angeles, Ontario
 Physical Therapist Assistant (associate) - Anaheim; accredited by the American Physical Therapy Association

References

Private universities and colleges in California
For-profit universities and colleges in the United States
Vocational education in the United States
Nursing schools in California